Kristo Kollo (born 17 January 1990) is an Estonian volleyball and beach volleyball player who currently plays for Cypriot club Pafiakos Paphos. He also reprsesnts the Estonian national team internationally.

As a member of the senior Estonia men's national volleyball team, Kollo competed at the 2017, 2019 and 2021 European Volleyball Championships.

Sporting achievements

Clubs
Baltic League
  2007/2008 – with Pere Leib Tartu
  2008/2009 – with Pere Leib Tartu
  2009/2010 – with Pere Leib Tartu
  2011/2012 – with Pere Leib Tartu
  2013/2014 – with Bigbank Tartu
  2014/2015 – with Bigbank Tartu
  2020/2021 – with Selver Tallinn

National championship
 2007/2008  Estonian Championship, with Pere Leib Tartu
 2008/2009  Estonian Championship, with Pere Leib Tartu
 2009/2010  Estonian Championship, with Pere Leib Tartu
 2010/2011  Estonian Championship, with Pere Leib Tartu
 2011/2012  Estonian Championship, with Pere Leib Tartu
 2013/2014  Estonian Championship, with Bigbank Tartu
 2014/2015  Estonian Championship, with Bigbank Tartu
 2016/2017  Swiss Championship, with TV Schönenwerd
 2019/2020  Romanian Championship, with CS Arcada Galați
 2020/2021  Estonian Championship, with Selver Tallinn
 2021/2022  Finnish Championship, with Akaa-Volley

National cup
 2007/2008  Estonian Cup, with Pere Leib Tartu
 2008/2009  Estonian Cup, with Pere Leib Tartu
 2011/2012  Estonian Cup, with Pere Leib Tartu
 2013/2014  Estonian Cup, with Bigbank Tartu
 2019/2020  Romanian Supercup, with CS Arcada Galați
 2020/2021  Estonian Cup, with Selver Tallinn

National team
 2018  European League
 2018  Challenger Cup
 2021  European League

Beach
 2007  U18 European Championship, with Oliver Venno
 2008  U19 World Championship, with Oliver Venno
 2011  Estonian Championship, with Argo Arak
 2016  Estonian Championship, with Karl Jaani
 2020  Estonian Championship, with Oliver Venno
 2022  Estonian Championship, with Karl Jaani

References

1990 births
Living people
Estonian men's volleyball players
Sportspeople from Tartu
Estonian beach volleyball players
Estonian expatriate volleyball players
Estonian expatriate sportspeople in Switzerland
Expatriate volleyball players in Switzerland
Estonian expatriate sportspeople in Italy
Expatriate volleyball players in Italy
Estonian expatriate sportspeople in Romania
Expatriate volleyball players in Romania
European Games competitors for Estonia
Beach volleyball players at the 2015 European Games
Estonian expatriate sportspeople in Finland
Expatriate volleyball players in Finland
Estonian expatriate sportspeople in Cyprus
Expatriate volleyball players in Cyprus